Gasque is an unincorporated community in Baldwin County, Alabama, United States.

History
The community is named after the Gasque family, who lived in the area. A post office operated under the name Gasque from 1880 to 1953.

References

Unincorporated communities in Baldwin County, Alabama
Unincorporated communities in Alabama